Lake Nyos is a crater lake in the  Northwest Region of Cameroon, located about  northwest of Yaoundé, the capital. Nyos is a deep lake high on the flank of an inactive volcano in the Oku volcanic plain along the Cameroon line of volcanic activity. A volcanic dam impounds the lake waters.

A pocket of magma lies beneath the lake and leaks carbon dioxide into the water, changing it into carbonic acid. Nyos is one of only three lakes known to be saturated with carbon dioxide in this way, and therefore prone to limnic eruptions (the others being Lake Monoun, also in Cameroon, and Lake Kivu in the Democratic Republic of Congo and Rwanda).

Though not completely unprecedented, it was the first known large-scale asphyxiation caused by a natural event. To prevent a recurrence, a degassing tube that siphons water from the bottom layers to the top, allowing the carbon dioxide to leak in safe quantities, was installed in 2001. Two additional tubes were installed in 2011.

Today, the lake also poses a threat because its natural wall is weakening. A geological tremor could cause this natural levee to give way, allowing water to rush into downstream villages all the way into Nigeria and allowing large amounts of carbon dioxide to escape.

Geography

Lake Nyos lies within the Oku Volcanic Field, located near the northern boundary of the Cameroon Volcanic Line, a zone of volcanoes and other tectonic activity that extends southwest to the Mt. Cameroon stratovolcano. The field consists of volcanic maars and basaltic scoria cones.

Formation and geologic history
Villages along the road in the vicinity of the lake include Cha, Nyos, Munji, Djingbe, and Subum.

Lake Nyos fills a roughly circular maar in the Oku Volcanic Field, an explosion crater caused when a lava flow interacted violently with groundwater. The maar is believed to have formed in an eruption a maximum of 12,000 years ago, and is 1,800 m (5,900 ft) across and 208 m (682 ft) deep. The area has been volcanically active for millions of years—after South America and Africa were split apart by plate tectonics about 110 million years ago, West Africa also experienced rifting, although to a lesser degree. The rift is known as the Mbéré Rift Valley, and crustal extension has allowed magma to reach the surface along a line extending through Cameroon. Mount Cameroon also lies on this fault line. Lake Nyos is surrounded by old lava flows and pyroclastic deposits.

Although Nyos is situated within an extinct volcano, magma still exists beneath it. Approximately  directly below the lake resides a pool of magma, which releases carbon dioxide and other gases; the gases then travel upward through the earth. The fumes then dissolve in the natural springs encircling the lake, ultimately rising to the surface of the water and leaching into the lake.

The lake waters are held in place by a natural dam composed of volcanic rock.

Gas saturation
Lake Nyos is one of only three lakes in the world known to be saturated with carbon dioxide—the others are Lake Monoun, also in Cameroon, and Lake Kivu in the Democratic Republic of Congo.

Lake Nyos is thermally stratified, with layers of warm, less dense water near the surface floating on the colder, denser water layers near the lake's bottom. Over long periods, carbon dioxide gas seeping into the cold water at the lake's bottom is dissolved in great amounts.

Most of the time, the lake is stable and the  remains in solution in the lower layers. However, over time, the water becomes supersaturated, and if an event such as an earthquake or landslide occurs, large amounts of  may suddenly come out of solution.

1986 disaster

Although a sudden outgassing of  had occurred at Lake Monoun in 1984, a similar threat from Lake Nyos was not anticipated. It then rushed down two valleys branching off to the north, displacing all of the air and suffocating 1,746 people within  of the lake, mostly rural villagers, as well as 3,500 livestock. The villages most affected were Cha, Nyos, and Subum.

Scientists concluded from evidence that a  fountain of water and foam formed at the surface of the lake. The huge amount of water rising suddenly caused much turbulence in the water, spawning a wave of at least  that would scour the shore of one side.

It is not known what triggered the catastrophic outgassing. Most geologists suspect a landslide, but some believe that a small volcanic eruption may have occurred on the bed of the lake. A third possibility is that cool rainwater falling on one side of the lake triggered the overturn. Others still believe there was a small earthquake, but as witnesses did not report feeling any tremors on the morning of the disaster, this hypothesis is unlikely. Whatever the cause, the event resulted in the rapid mixing of the supersaturated deep water with the upper layers of the lake, where the reduced pressure allowed the stored  to effervesce out of solution.

The normally blue waters of the lake turned a deep red after the outgassing, due to iron-rich water from the deep rising to the surface and being oxidised by the air. The level of the lake dropped by about a metre and trees near the lake were knocked down.

Degassing

The scale of the 1986 disaster led to much study on how a recurrence could be prevented. Estimates of the rate of carbon dioxide entering the lake suggested that outgassings could occur every 10–30 years, though a recent study shows  that release of water from the lake, caused by erosion of the natural barrier that keeps in the lake's water, could in turn reduce pressure on the lake's carbon dioxide and cause a gas escape much sooner.

Several researchers independently proposed the installation of degassing columns from rafts in the lake. In 1992 at Monoun, and in 1995 at Nyos, a French team directed by Michel Halbwachs demonstrated the feasibility of this approach. In 2001, the U.S. Office of Foreign Disaster Assistance funded a permanent installation at Nyos.

In 2011, two additional pipes were installed by Michel Halbwachs and his French-Cameroonian team to assure the complete degassing of Lake Nyos.

Following the disaster, scientists investigated other African lakes to see if a similar phenomenon could happen elsewhere. Lake Kivu, 2,000 times larger than Lake Nyos, was also found to be supersaturated, and geologists found evidence for outgassing events around the lake about every thousand years. The eruption of nearby Mount Nyiragongo in 2002 sent lava flowing into the lake, raising fears that a gas eruption could be triggered, but it was not, as the flow of lava stopped well before it got near the bottom layers of the lake, where the gas is maintained in solution by the water pressure.

Weakening dam
In 2005, Isaac Njilah, a geologist at the University of Yaoundé, suggested that the natural dam of volcanic rock that keeps in the lake's waters could collapse in the near future. Erosion has worn the dam away, causing holes and pockets to develop in the dam's upper layer, and water already passes through the lower section. Meanwhile, landslides have reduced dam strength on the outside. Seismic activity caused by the lake's volcanic foundation could thus cause the lake wall to give way, resulting in up to 50 million m3 (1.8 billion ft3) of water flooding downhill into areas of the Northwest Province and the Nigerian states of Taraba and Benue.

The Cameroonian government, speaking through Gregory Tanyi-Leke of the Institute of Mining and Geological Research, acknowledges the weakening wall, but denies that it presents any immediate threat. A United Nations team led by Olaf Van Duin and Nisa Nurmohamed of the Netherlands' Ministry of Transport and Public Works inspected the dam over three days in September 2005, and confirmed that the natural lip had weakened. Van Duin believed that the dam would breach within the next 10 to 20 years.

One possible means of averting such a catastrophe would be to strengthen the lake wall, though this would take much time and money.

Return of population
Despite the risks from carbon dioxide and collapse of the lake's retaining wall, the area is being resettled. Settlers cite the wish to return to ancestral lands (although some are newcomers) and the great fertility of the land as reasons for their return.

In popular culture
 [Nyos: The ceremony of innocence] (2016), a novel by Basileios Drolias focusing on the lake Nyos disaster.

Stikvallei [Choke Valley] (2013), a non-fiction account of the lake Nyos disaster by Frank Westerman.

See also

References

Further reading
"Cameroon scientist denies dam about to collapse" (August 23, 2005). Reuters.
Cotel A (1999), A trigger mechanism for the Lake Nyos disaster, American Physical Society, Division of Fluid Dynamics Meeting, November 21–23, 1999
Decker, R. and Decker, B. (1997) Volcanoes, 3rd edition, WH Freeman, New York.
Musa, Tansa (September 28, 2005). "Cameroon dam could collapse in 10 years-UN experts". Reuters.
Musa, Tansa (August 18, 2005). "Cameroon dam nears collapse, 10,000 lives at risk". Reuters.
Sano Y., Kusakabe M., Hirabayashi J. et al. (1990), Helium and carbon fluxes in Lake Nyos, Cameroon: constraint on next gas burst, Earth and Planetary Science Letters, v. 99, p. 303–314
Sano Y., Wakita H., Ohsumi T., Kusakabe M. (1987), Helium isotope evidence for magmatic gases in Lake Nyos, Cameroon, Geophysical Research Letters, v. 14, p. 1039–1041
Stager, J.C. (1987), "Silent Death from Cameroon's Killer Lake", National Geographic, September 1987
Gideon Aghaindum, Ajeagah (2017) "Eco-autopsy of the lake Nyos disaster in Cameroon: 30 Years After Calamity".

External links

Lake Nyos Degassing: in 1995 Michel HALBWACHS with his french scientist team found the solution for lake Nyos degassing problem 
Lake Nyos incident
BBC News 'On This Day' article
BBC news article about the degassing of Lake Nyos
BBC Horizon episode Killer lakes
USGS information
Defusing Africa’s Killer Lakes – Smithsonian
Gas threat grows from Cameroon's lethal lakes — The Guardian
Lake Nyos – The Vanguard, Cameroon
BBC News 27 Sep 2005: Action needed on deadly lakes
Mechanics of the switching on of the trigger mechanism of limnological catastrophes – Latvian research by Nataliya Anatolievna Solodovnik and Anatoliy Borisovich Solodovnik
BBC Article on Lake Kivu A similar problem at Lake Kivu and plans to deal with it
The Strangest Disaster of the 20th Century reprinted from Uncle John's Bathroom Reader: World of Odd.

Active volcanoes
Volcanic crater lakes
Lakes of Cameroon
Maars of Cameroon
Mbéré Rift Valley
Meromictic lakes
Northwest Region (Cameroon)
Rift volcanoes
Limnically active lakes